Now You See Inside is the debut album by American rock band SR-71, with "Right Now" being its lone radio hit single. The title comes from a line in the bridge of "What a Mess". In December 2000, SR-71 toured the US east coast with American Hi-Fi.

Music

"Now You See Inside" has been described as pop rock, power pop, and pop punk.

Track listing

Charting positions

Single

Personnel

SR-71
 Mitch Allan – vocals, rhythm guitar
 Dan Garvin – drums, percussion, backing vocals
 Jeff Reid – bass, keyboards, backing vocals
 Mark Beauchemin – lead guitar, keyboards, backing vocals

Additional personnel
 John Allen – backing vocals
 Kevin Kadish – backing vocals
 John Shanks – guitars
 Gil Norton – keyboards
 Mark Pythian – keyboards
 Patrick Warren – keyboards
 Rob Ladd – percussion
 Richard George – violin
 Chris Tombling – violin
 Audrey Riley – cello
 Richard Bissell – French horn

Non-performing personnel
 Engineered by: Graham Dominy, Brandon Mason, Bradley Cook
 Mixing by: Jack Joseph, Neal Avron
 Second Engineer: Richard Ash
 Mastering by: Ted Jensen

References

2000 debut albums
SR-71 (band) albums
Albums produced by David Bendeth
Albums produced by Gil Norton